Victor von Herzfeld (October 8, 1856 in Pozsony (Austria-Hungary) – February 19, 1919 in Budapest (Hungary)) was a Hungarian violinist and composer. He studied at the University of Vienna in law and at the Music Academy of Vienna music where he won first prize for both composition and violin playing. In 1884, he was awarded the Beethoven prize of the Society of the Friends of Music. He studied in Berlin with Eduard Grell and in 1886 went to Budapest as Professor in the Music Academy. He was second violin in the original Budapest Quartet established by David Popper and Jenő Hubay. Ernő Dohnányi dedicated his Sonata in C♯ minor for violin and piano, Op. 21 (1912) to Von Herzfeld. While serving as the music critic of the "Neue Pester Journal" he wrote a negative review of his friend and colleague Gustav Mahler's First Symphony. He is the author of a 1915 article on Robert Volkmann. He was buried at Kerepesi Cemetery in Budapest.

References 

Hungarian classical composers
Hungarian male classical composers
Hungarian classical violinists
Male classical violinists
Hungarian musicians
Hungarian music educators
University of Music and Performing Arts Vienna alumni
Academic staff of the Franz Liszt Academy of Music
1856 births
1919 deaths